The action of 4 August 1800 was a highly unusual naval engagement that took place off the Brazilian coast during the French Revolutionary Wars. A French frigate force that had been raiding British commerce off West Africa approached and attempted to attack a convoy of valuable East Indiamen (large and heavily armed merchant vessels sailing from Britain to British India and China), two ships sailing for Botany Bay, and a whaler sailing for the South Seas' whale fishery. The small British ship of the line  escorted the convoy, which otherwise had to rely on the ships' individual armament to protect them from attack. Due to their large size, the East Indiamen could be mistaken for ships of the line at a distance, and the French commander Commodore Jean-François Landolphe was un-nerved when the convoy formed a line of battle. Supposing his target to be a fleet of powerful warships he turned to escape and the British commander, Captain Rowley Bulteel, immediately ordered a pursuit. To preserve the impression of warships he also ordered four of his most powerful East Indiamen to join the chase.

Belliqueux rapidly out ran Landolphe's flagship Concorde, leaving Landolphe with no option but to surrender without any serious resistance. The rest of the French squadron continued to flee separately during the night, each pursued by two East Indiamen. Believing himself outgunned, Captain Jean-Daniel Coudin, of Médée, surrendered, only discovering his assailant's true identity when he came aboard Exeter. The action is the only occasion during the war in which a British merchant vessel captured a large French warship.

Background
By 1800, the British and French had been at war for seven years and the British dominated the sea, following a number of significant victories over the French, Dutch and Spanish fleets. Off every French port, large squadrons of British ships of the line and frigates awaited French movements and whenever possible intercepted and destroyed French merchant vessels and warships. While British trading ships travelled in large, well-armed convoys, French ships were forced to slip between harbours to avoid the British blockade. To counter British control of the seas, the French periodically despatched squadrons of ships to raid British trade lanes, particularly off West Africa and in the South Atlantic, where the stretched Royal Navy maintained only minimal forces.

The large convoys of East Indiamen were among the principal targets for any French raider. These huge ships sailed from Britain with general cargo, or often military stores and troops, to India or other ports in the Indian Ocean, South East Asia, or China. There they would sell their cargoes and take on spices, tea, silk and other luxury goods before making the return journey to Britain. A round trip took over a year and an East Indiaman sailing to Britain would routinely carry hundreds of thousands of pounds worth of trade goods; one large convoy that sailed from Canton in January 1804 was worth over £8 million. East Indiamen were well-protected, armed with up to 30 guns, and generally travelled in large convoys in which the ships could provide one another with mutual protection. Such convoys often had a Royal Navy escort, usually including a ship of the line.

On 6 March 1799, a French squadron had sailed from Rochefort. Consisting of the frigates Concorde, under Commodore Jean-François Landolphe, Médée, under Captain Jean-Daniel Coudin, and Franchise, under Captain Pierre Jurien, it was a powerful force, capable of inflicting significant damage on lightly defended merchant shipping. Eluding the blockade force off Rochefort, the squadron sailed southwards until it reached the coast of West Africa. There Landolphe's ships began an extended commerce raiding operation, inflicting severe damage on the West African trade during the rest of the year. Eventually the strain of serving in tropical waters told on the ships and all three were forced to undergo an extensive refit in the nearest available allied shipyards, which were located in the Spanish-held River Plate in South America. Repairs continued for six months, until Landolphe considered the squadron once again ready to sail in the early summer of 1800. The squadron almost immediately captured an American schooner, which it fitted out as a tender. At the time, France and the United States had been engaged for two years in the Quasi War.

Battle
The sole British warship was Belliqueux. On 4 August they were near the island of Trinidade off the Brazilian coast. From there the East Indiamen would catch the westerly trade winds that would carry them to Saint Helena, the Cape of Good Hope, and their destinations.

At 07:00 on 4 August, while the French squadron was cruising off the Brazilian coast, lookouts sighted sails on the horizon. Uncertain of the identity of the strange ships, the French gradually closed the distance during the morning. Landolphe could see that there were seven large vessels and three smaller ships, all unmistakably British. He was unable however to tell whether they were naval ships of the line or East Indiamen. Initially he thought they might be merchant ships, but at noon he sighted double rows of gunports along the side of each ship and called off the attack, turning away and signalling for his squadron to split up, believing the enemy to be large warships easily capable of destroying his small force. Captain Jurien protested Landolphe's order, insisting that the convoy was composed of merchant ships and not warships, but Landolphe over-ruled Jurien's protests. In fact, Jurien was correct.

With the French in full flight, Bulteel determined to continue the ruse that his convoy consisted of warships. While he and Belliqueux pursued Concorde, he signalled for his largest East Indiamen to follow the other French ships to ensure that they did not return and counterattack the convoy while Belliqueux was engaged. Exeter, under Captain Henry Meriton, and Bombay Castle, under Captain John Hamilton, were to follow Médée while Coutts, under Captain Robert Torin, and Neptune, under Captain Nathaniel Spens, were to follow Franchise. All four vessels were over 1200 tons (bm) and carried 30 cannon each, but none had more than 130 crew aboard and could not compete in accuracy or rate of fire with the 315 men aboard each of the French ships. Throughout the afternoon the chase continued, with Belliqueux steadily gaining on the French flagship while Franchise, accompanied by the American schooner, gained on her pursuers. At 17:20, Bulteel was within long range of Landolphe's ship, which returned fire when possible. During the exchange of gunfire neither side suffered damage or casualties, but the ship of the line was clearly gaining on the frigate and within ten minutes Landolphe surrendered rather than see his ship destroyed and his men killed in an unequal combat.

By 19:00, Franchise had dumped her lifeboats and a large quantity of guns and supplies overboard, lightening the ship enough for her to far outstrip the pursuit. As night fell the French frigate made a full escape from the British force. Médée however had not escaped. Although Bombay Castle was many miles behind, only distantly visible on the horizon, Exeter had been able to follow the frigate closely. Meriton was aware that the French warship was much stronger than his own merchant vessel, but realized that as the frigate had made no effort to fight, her commander must believe Exeter to be a ship of the line. To reinforce this image in the rapidly approaching darkness, Meriton arranged lights behind every gunport, whether or not it contained a cannon, creating an effect described as "a fearsome, leering jack-o'-lantern". As his ship drew level with the French frigate, Meriton hailed the enemy's deck, calling on them to surrender. Intimidated by this large and seemingly powerful enemy, Coudin decided that his only option was to strike his flag and come aboard the British ship to surrender formally. Arriving on board, he was astonished to see far fewer and smaller guns than a warship normally carried. When Coudin asked to whom he had surrendered, Meriton is said to have replied "To a merchantman". Appalled, Coudin demanded to be allowed to return to his ship and conduct a formal naval battle, but Meriton refused.

Aftermath
In the engagement on 4 August 1800  neither side had a single man killed or wounded; the action still inflicted a severe naval defeat on a powerful French frigate force, ending its successful raiding career. Captain Jurien in Franchise spent another three weeks off the Brazilian coast before returning to France. On 9 August he encountered the merchantman Wellesley, which was on her way to the Cape, but after an engagement of about an hour, the British ship succeeded in driving off her attacker. Jurien followed Wellesley for two days but then gave up the chase; he then did not see another sail until he left the area.

Bulteel's convoy continued on, pausing at Rio de Janeiro on 12 August to resupply. The East Indiamen then went on to Saint Helena on their way to Asia. The two Botany Bay ships sailed on to Australia and the whaler Seringapatam sailed for the South Seas.

The captured frigates were valuable prizes but the Royal Navy only acquired Medée, which it took into service as HMS Medee; the Navy never commissioned Medee but instead used as a prison ship for a few years before selling her in 1805. The frigates had come into port shortly before the Peace of Amiens and thus were deemed surplus to Navy requirements. The ships and their stores and equipment were sold privately; the proceeds from the sale were paid as prize money in February 1803. The British crews also benefited from head-money, a financial award for each French sailor captured during the engagement.

Bulteel and Meriton were commended. Meriton was to fight two more naval battles against the French, serving at the successful defence of the China Fleet at the Battle of Pulo Aura in February 1804. He was badly wounded and captured by a French frigate squadron after a fierce defence at the action of 3 July 1810.

Citations and references
Citations

References
 
 
 Grant, James (1803) The narrative of a voyage of discovery: Performed in the years 1800, 1801 and 1802 to New South Wales... (Egerton).
 
 
 
 
 
 

Conflicts in 1800
Naval battles involving France
Naval battles of the French Revolutionary Wars
Naval battles involving the British East India Company
Naval battles involving Great Britain